The precautionary principle (or precautionary approach) is a broad epistemological, philosophical and legal approach to innovations with potential for causing harm when extensive scientific knowledge on the matter is lacking. It emphasizes caution, pausing and review before leaping into new innovations that may prove disastrous. Critics argue that it is vague, self-cancelling, unscientific and an obstacle to progress.

In an engineering context, the precautionary principle manifests itself as the factor of safety, discussed in detail in the monograph of Elishakoff. It was apparently suggested, in civil engineering, by Belindor in 1729. Interrelation between safety factor and reliability is extensively studied by engineers and philosophers.

The principle is often used by policy makers in situations where there is the possibility of harm from making a certain decision (e.g. taking a particular course of action) and conclusive evidence is not yet available. For example, a government may decide to limit or restrict the widespread release of a medicine or new technology until it has been thoroughly tested. The principle acknowledges that while the progress of science and technology has often brought great benefit to humanity, it has also contributed to the creation of new threats and risks. It implies that there is a social responsibility to protect the public from exposure to such harm, when scientific investigation has found a plausible risk. These protections should be relaxed only if further scientific findings emerge that provide sound evidence that no harm will result.

The principle has become an underlying rationale for a large and increasing number of international treaties and declarations in the fields of sustainable development, environmental protection, health, trade, and food safety, although at times it has attracted debate over how to accurately define it and apply it to complex scenarios with multiple risks. In some legal systems, as in law of the European Union, the application of the precautionary principle has been made a statutory requirement in some areas of law.

Origins and theory
The concept "precautionary principle" is generally considered to have arisen in English from a translation of the German term Vorsorgeprinzip in the 1970s in response to forest degradation and sea pollution, where German lawmakers adopted clean air act banning use of certain substances suspected in causing the environmental damage even though evidence of their impact was inconclusive at that time. The concept was introduced into environmental legislation along with other innovative (at that time) mechanisms such as "polluter pays", principle of pollution prevention and responsibility for survival of future ecosystems.

The precautionary principle was promulgated in philosophy by Hans Jonas in his 1979 text, The Imperative of Responsibility, wherein Jonas argued that technology had altered the range of the impact of human action and, as such, ethics must be modified so that the far distant effects of one's actions should now be considered.  His maxim is designed to embody the precautionary principle in its prescription that one should "Act so that the effects of your action are compatible with the permanence of genuine human life" or, stated conversely, "Do not compromise the conditions for an indefinite continuation of humanity on earth." To achieve this Jonas argued for the cultivation of a cautious, even fearful attitude, toward actions that may endanger the future of humanity or the biosphere that supported it.  

In 1988, Konrad von Moltke described the German concept for a British audience, which he translated into English as the precautionary principle.

In economics, the Precautionary Principle has been analyzed in terms of "the effect on rational decision-making", of "the interaction of irreversibility" and "uncertainty". Authors such as Epstein (1980) and Arrow and Fischer (1974) show that "irreversibility of possible future consequences" creates a "quasi-option effect" which should induce a "risk-neutral" society to favour current decisions that allow for more flexibility in the future. Gollier et al. conclude that "more scientific uncertainty as to the distribution of a future risk – that is, a larger variability of beliefs – should induce society to take stronger prevention measures today."

The principle was also derived from religious beliefs that particular areas of science and technology should be restricted as they "belong to the realm of God", as postulated by Prince Charles and Pope Benedict XVI.

Formulations 
Many definitions of the precautionary principle exist: Precaution may be defined as "caution in advance", "caution practiced in the context of uncertainty", or informed prudence. Two ideas lie at the core of the principle:

an expression of a need by decision-makers to anticipate harm before it occurs. Within this element lies an implicit reversal of the onus of proof: under the precautionary principle it is the responsibility of an activity-proponent to establish that the proposed activity will not (or is very unlikely to) result in significant harm.
the concept of proportionality of the risk and the cost and feasibility of a proposed action.

One of the primary foundations of the precautionary principle, and globally accepted definitions, results from the work of the Rio Conference, or "Earth Summit" in 1992. Principle 15 of the Rio Declaration notes:

In 1998 Wingspread Statement on the Precautionary Principle was convened by the Science and Environmental Health Network and concluded with the following formulation, described by Stewart Brand as "the clearest and most frequently cited":

In February 2000, the Commission of the European Communities noted in a Communication from the Commission on the Precautionary Principle that, "The precautionary principle is not defined in the Treaties of the European Union, which prescribes it [the Precautionary Principle] only once – to protect the environment. But in practice, its scope is much wider, and specifically where preliminary-objective-scientific-evaluation indicates that there are reasonable grounds for concern that potentially dangerous effects on the environment, human, animal or [and] plant health may be inconsistent with the high level of protection [for what] chosen for the Community."

The January 2000 Cartagena Protocol on Biosafety says, in regard to controversies over GMOs: "Lack of scientific certainty due to insufficient relevant scientific information ... shall not prevent the Party of [I]mport, in order to avoid or minimize such potential adverse effects, from taking a decision, as appropriate, with regard to the import of the living modified organism in question."

Application
Various interests being represented by various groups proposing the principle resulted in great variability of its formulation: one study identified 14 different formulations of the principle in treaties and non-treaty declarations. R.B. Stewart (2002) reduced the precautionary principle to four basic versions:

 Scientific uncertainty should not automatically preclude regulation of activities that pose a potential risk of significant harm (non-preclusion).
 Regulatory controls should incorporate a margin of safety; activities should be limited below the level at which no adverse effect has been observed or predicted (margin of safety).
 Activities that present an uncertain potential for significant harm should be subject to best technology available requirements to minimize the risk of harm unless the proponent of the activity shows that they present no appreciable risk of harm (BAT).
 Activities that present an uncertain potential for significant harm should be prohibited unless the proponent of the activity shows that it presents no appreciable risk of harm (prohibitory).

Carolyn Raffensperger of the Wingspread convention placed the principle in opposition to approaches based on risk management and cost-benefit analysis. Dave Brower (Friends of the Earth) concluded that "all technology should be assumed guilty until proven innocent". Freeman Dyson described the application of precautionary principle as "deliberately one-sided", for example when used as justification to destroy genetic engineering research plantations and threaten researchers in spite of scientific evidence demonstrating lack of harm.

As noted by Rupert and O'Riordan, the challenge in application of the principle is "in making it clear that absence of certainty, or there being insufficient evidence-based analysis, were not impediments to innovation, so long as there was no reasonable likelihood of serious harm". Lack of this nuanced application makes the principle "self-cancelling" according to Stewart Brand, because "nothing is fully established" in science, starting from the precautionary principle itself and including "gravity or Darwinian evolution". A balanced application should ensure that "precautionary measures should be" only taken "during early stages" and as "relevant scientific evidence becomes established", regulatory measures should only respond to that evidence.

Strong vs. weak 
Strong precaution holds that regulation is required whenever there is a possible risk to health, safety, or the environment, even if the supporting evidence is speculative and even if the economic costs of regulation are high. In 1982, the United Nations World Charter for Nature gave the first international recognition to the strong version of the principle, suggesting that when "potential adverse effects are not fully understood, the activities should not proceed". The widely publicised Wingspread Declaration, from a meeting of environmentalists in 1998, is another example of the strong version. Strong precaution can also be termed as a "no-regrets" principle, where costs are not considered in preventative action.

Weak precaution holds that lack of scientific evidence does not preclude action if damage would otherwise be serious and irreversible. Humans practice weak precaution every day, and often incur costs, to avoid hazards that are far from certain: we do not walk in moderately dangerous areas at night, we exercise, we buy smoke detectors, we buckle our seatbelts.

According to a publication by the New Zealand Treasury Department,

International agreements and declarations

"Principle" vs. "approach"
No introduction to the precautionary principle would be complete without brief reference to the difference between the precautionary principle and the precautionary approach. Principle 15 of the Rio Declaration 1992 states that: "in order to protect the environment, the precautionary approach shall be widely applied by States according to their capabilities. Where there are threats of serious or irreversible damage, lack of full scientific certainty shall be not used as a reason for postponing cost-effective measures to prevent environmental degradation." As Garcia (1995) pointed out, "the wording, largely similar to that of the principle, is subtly different in that:  it recognizes that there may be differences in local capabilities to apply the approach, and  it calls for cost-effectiveness in applying the approach, e.g., taking economic and social costs into account." The "approach" is generally considered a softening of the "principle".

European Union
On 2 February 2000, the European Commission issued a Communication on the precautionary principle, in which it adopted a procedure for the application of this concept, but without giving a detailed definition of it. Paragraph 2 of article 191 of the Lisbon Treaty states that

After the adoption of the European Commission's communication on the precautionary principle, the principle has come to inform much EU policy, including areas beyond environmental policy. As of 2006 it had been integrated into EU laws "in matters such as general product safety, the use of additives for use in animal nutrition, the incineration of waste, and the regulation of genetically modified organisms". Through its application in case law, it has become a "general principle of EU law".

In Case T-74/00 Artegodan, the General Court (then Court of First Instance) appeared willing to extrapolate from the limited provision for the precautionary principle in environmental policy in article 191(2) TFEU to a general principle of EU law.

France 

In France, the Charter for the Environment contains a formulation of the precautionary principle (article 5):

United States
On 18 July 2005, the City of San Francisco passed a precautionary principle purchasing ordinance, which requires the city to weigh the environmental and health costs of its $600 million in annual purchases – for everything from cleaning supplies to computers. Members of the Bay Area Working Group on the Precautionary Principle contributed to drafting the Ordinance.

Australia
The most important Australian court case so far, due to its exceptionally detailed consideration of the precautionary principle, is Telstra Corporation Limited v Hornsby Shire Council.

The principle was summarised by reference to the NSW Protection of the Environment Administration Act 1991, which itself provides a good definition of the principle:

"If there are threats of serious or irreversible environmental damage, lack of full scientific certainty should not be used as a reasoning for postponing measures to prevent environmental degradation. In the application of the principle... decisions should be guided by:
(i) careful evaluation to avoid, wherever practicable, serious or irreversible damage to the environment; and
(ii) an assessment of risk-weighted consequence of various options".

The most significant points of Justice Preston's decision are the following findings:
 The principle and accompanying need to take precautionary measures is "triggered" when two prior conditions exist: a threat of serious or irreversible damage, and scientific uncertainty as to the extent of possible damage.
 Once both are satisfied, "a proportionate precautionary measure may be taken to avert the anticipated threat of environmental damage, but it should be proportionate."
 The threat of serious or irreversible damage should invoke consideration of five factors: the scale of threat (local, regional etc.); the perceived value of the threatened environment; whether the possible impacts are manageable; the level of public concern, and whether there is a rational or scientific basis for the concern.
 The consideration of the level of scientific uncertainty should involve factors which may include: what would constitute sufficient evidence; the level and kind of uncertainty; and the potential to reduce uncertainty.
 The principle shifts the burden of proof. If the principle applies, the burden shifts: "a decision maker must assume the threat of serious or irreversible environmental damage is... a reality [and] the burden of showing this threat... is negligible reverts to the proponent..."
 The precautionary principle invokes preventative action: "the principle permits the taking of preventative measures without having to wait until the reality and seriousness of the threat become fully known".
 "The precautionary principle should not be used to try to avoid all risks."
 The precautionary measures appropriate will depend on the combined effect of "the degree of seriousness and irreversibility of the threat and the degree of uncertainty... the more significant and uncertain the threat, the greater...the precaution required". "...measures should be adopted... proportionate to the potential threats".

Philippines
A petition filed 17 May 2013 by environmental group Greenpeace Southeast Asia and farmer-scientist coalition Masipag (Magsasaka at Siyentipiko sa Pagpapaunlad ng Agrikultura) asked the appellate court to stop the planting of Bt eggplant in test fields, saying the impacts of such an undertaking to the environment, native crops and human health are still unknown. The Court of Appeals granted the petition, citing the precautionary principle stating "when human activities may lead to threats of serious and irreversible damage to the environment that is scientifically plausible but uncertain, actions shall be taken to avoid or diminish the threat."
Respondents filed a motion for reconsideration in June 2013 and on 20 September 2013 the Court of Appeals chose to uphold their May decision saying the bt talong field trials violate the people's constitutional right to a "balanced and healthful ecology." The Supreme Court on 8 December 2015 permanently stopped the field testing for Bt (Bacillus thuringiensis) talong (eggplant), upholding the decision of the Court of Appeals which stopped the field trials for the genetically modified eggplant. The court is the first in the world to adopt the precautionary principle regarding GMO products in its decision. The Supreme Court decision was later reversed following an appeal by researchers at the University of the Philippines Los Baños.

Corporate 
Body Shop International, a UK-based cosmetics company, included the precautionary principle in their 2006 chemicals strategy.

Environment and health 
Fields typically concerned by the precautionary principle are the possibility of:
 Global warming or abrupt climate change in general
 Extinction of species
 Introduction of new products into the environment, with potential impact on biodiversity (e.g., genetically modified organisms)
 Threats to public health, due to new diseases and techniques (e.g., HIV transmitted through blood transfusion)
 Long-term effects of new technologies (e.g. health concerns regarding radiation from cell phones and other electronics communications devices)
 Persistent or acute pollution (e.g., asbestos, endocrine disruptors)
 Food safety (e.g., Creutzfeldt–Jakob disease)
 Other new biosafety issues (e.g., artificial life, new molecules)

The precautionary principle is often applied to biological fields because changes cannot be easily contained and have the potential of being global. The principle has less relevance to contained fields such as aeronautics, where the few people undergoing risk have given informed consent (e.g., a test pilot). In the case of technological innovation, containment of impact tends to be more difficult if that technology can self-replicate. Bill Joy emphasised the dangers of replicating genetic technology, nanotechnology, and robotic technology in his article in Wired, "Why the future doesn't need us", though he does not specifically cite the precautionary principle. The application of the principle can be seen in the public policy of requiring pharmaceutical companies to carry out clinical trials to show that new medications are safe.

Oxford based philosopher Nick Bostrom discusses the idea of a future powerful superintelligence, and the risks should it attempt to gain atomic level control of matter.

Application of the principle modifies the status of innovation and risk assessment: it is not the risk that must be avoided or amended, but a potential risk that must be prevented. Thus, in the case of regulation of scientific research, there is a third party beyond the scientist and the regulator: the consumer.

In an analysis concerning application of the precautionary principle to nanotechnology, Chris Phoenix and Mike Treder posit that there are two forms of the principle, which they call the "strict form" and the "active form". The former "requires inaction when action might pose a risk", while the latter means "choosing less risky alternatives when they are available, and [...] taking responsibility for potential risks." Thomas Alured Faunce has argued for stronger application of the precautionary principle by chemical and health technology regulators particularly in relation to Ti02 and ZnO nanoparticles in sunscreens, biocidal nanosilver in waterways and products whose manufacture, handling or recycling exposes humans to the risk of inhaling multi-walled carbon nanotubes.

Resource management 

Several natural resources like fish stocks are now managed by precautionary approach, through harvest control rules (HCRs) based upon the precautionary principle. The figure indicates how the principle is implemented in the cod fisheries management proposed by the International Council for the Exploration of the Sea.

In classifying endangered species, the precautionary principle means that if there is doubt about an animal's or plant's exact conservation status, the one that would cause the strongest protective measures to be realised should be chosen. Thus, a species like the silvery pigeon that might exist in considerable numbers and simply be under-recorded or might just as probably be long extinct is not classified as "data deficient" or "extinct" (which both do not require any protective action to be taken), but as "critically endangered" (the conservation status that confers the need for the strongest protection), whereas the increasingly rare, but probably not yet endangered emerald starling is classified as "data deficient", because there is urgent need for research to clarify its status rather than for conservation action to save it from extinction.

If, for example, a large ground-water body that people use for drinking water is contaminated by bacteria (e.g. Escherichia coli O157:H7, Campylobacter or Leptospira) and the source of contamination is strongly suspected to be dairy cows but the exact science is not yet able to provide absolute proof, the cows should be removed from the environment until they are proved, by the dairy industry, not to be the source or until that industry ensures that such contamination will not recur.

Animal sentience precautionary principle 

Appeals to the precautionary principle have often characterized the debates concerning animal sentience – that is, the question of whether animals are able to feel "subjective experiences with an attractive or aversive quality", such as pain, pleasure, happiness, or joy – in relation to the question of whether we should legally protect sentient animals. A version of the precautionary principle suitable for the problem of animal sentience has been proposed by LSE philosopher Jonathan Birch: "The idea is that when the evidence of sentience is inconclusive, we should 'give the animal the benefit of doubt' or 'err on the side of caution' in formulating animal protection legislation." Since we cannot reach absolute certainty with regards to the fact that some animals are sentient, the precautionary principle has been invoked in order to grant potentially sentient animals "basic legal protections". Birch's formulation of the animal sentience precautionary principle runs as follows:This version of the precautionary principle consists of an epistemic and a decision rule. The former concerns the "evidential bar" that should be required for animal sentience. In other words, how much evidence of sentience is necessary before one decides to apply precautionary measures? According to Birch, only some evidence would be sufficient, which means that the evidential bar should be set at low levels. Birch proposes to consider the evidence that certain animals are sentient sufficient whenever "statistically significant evidence ... of the presence of at least one credible indicator of sentience in at least one species of that order" has been obtained. For practical reasons, Birch says, the evidence of sentience should concern the order, so that if one species meets the conditions of sentience, then all the species of the same order should be considered sentient and should be thus legally protected. This is due to the fact that, on the one hand, "to investigate sentience separately in different orders" is feasible, whereas on the other hand, since some orders include thousands of species, it would be unfeasible to study their sentience separately.

What is more, the evidential bar should be so low that only one indicator of sentience in the species of a specific order will be sufficient in order for the precautionary principle to be applied. Such indicator should be "an observable phenomenon that experiments can be designed to detect, and it must be credible that the presence of this indicator is explained by sentience". Lists of such criteria already exist for detecting animal pain. The aim is to create analogous lists for other criteria of sentience, such as happiness, fear, or joy. The presence of one of these criteria should be demonstrated by means of experiments which must meet "the normal scientific standards".

Regarding the second part of the animal sentience precautionary principle, the decision rule concerns the requirement that we have to act once there is sufficient evidence of a seriously bad outcome. According to Birch, "we should aim to include within the scope of animal protection legislation all animals for which the evidence of sentience is sufficient, according to the standard of sufficiency outlined [above]". In other words, the decision rule states that once the aforementioned low evidential bar is met, then we should act in a precautionary way. Birch's proposal also "deliberately leaves open the question of how, and to what extent, the treatment of these animals should be regulated", thus also leaving open the content of the regulations, as this will largely depend on the animal in question.

Criticisms
Critics of the principle use arguments similar to those against other formulations of technological conservatism.

Internal inconsistency: applying strong PP risks causing harm
Strong formulations of the precautionary principle, without regard to its most basic provisions (i.e., that it is to be applied only where risks are potentially catastrophic and not easily calculable), when applied to the principle itself as a policy decision, beats its own purpose of reducing risk. The reason suggested is that preventing innovation from coming to market means that only current technology may be used, and current technology itself may cause harm or leave needs unmet; there is a risk of causing harm by blocking innovation. As Michael Crichton wrote in his novel State of Fear: "The 'precautionary principle', properly applied, forbids the precautionary principle."

For example, forbidding nuclear power plants based on concerns about low-probability high-impact risks means continuing to rely on power plants that burn fossil fuels, which continue to release greenhouse gases and thousands of certain deaths from air pollution.

In 2021 in response to early reports about rare blood clots seen in 25 patients out of 20 million vaccinated by Astra-Zeneca COVID-19 vaccine a number of European Union member states suspended the use of the vaccine, quoting the "precautionary principle". This was criticized by other EU states who refused to suspend the vaccination program, declaring that the "precautionary" decisions are focusing on the wrong risk, as delay in a vaccination program results in a larger number of certain deaths than any yet unconfirmed complications.

In another example, the Hazardous Air Pollutant provisions in the 1990 amendments to the US Clean Air Act are an example of the Precautionary Principle where the onus is now on showing a listed compound is harmless. Under this rule no distinction is made between those air pollutants that provide a higher or lower risk, so operators tend to choose less-examined agents that are not on the existing list.

Blocking innovation and progress generally

Because applications of strong formulations of the precautionary principle can be used to block innovation, a technology which brings advantages may be banned by precautionary principle because of its potential for negative impacts, leaving the positive benefits unrealised.

The precautionary principle has been ethically questioned on the basis that its application could block progress in developing countries.

Vagueness and plausibility
The precautionary principle calls for action in the face of scientific uncertainty, but some formulations do not specify the minimal threshold of plausibility of risk that acts as a "triggering" condition, so that any indication that a proposed product or activity might harm health or the environment is sufficient to invoke the principle. In Sancho vs. DOE, Helen Gillmor, Senior District Judge, wrote in a dismissal of Wagner's lawsuit which included a popular worry that the LHC could cause "destruction of the earth" by a black hole:

The precautionary dilemma 
The most commonly pressed objection to the precautionary principle ties together two of the above objections into the form of a dilemma. This maintains that, of the two available interpretations of the principle, neither are plausible: weak formulations (which hold that precaution in the face of uncertain harms is permissible) are trivial, while strong formulations (which hold that precaution in the face of uncertain harms is required) are incoherent. On the first horn of the dilemma Cass Sunstein states: If all that the (weak) principle states is that it is permissible to act in a precautionary manner where there is a possible risk of harm, then it constitutes a trivial truism and thus fails to be useful.

If we formulate the principle in the stronger sense however, it looks like it rules out all courses of action, including the precautionary measures it is intended to advocate. This is because, if we stipulate that precaution is required in the face of uncertain harms, and precautionary measures also carry a risk of harm, the precautionary principle can both demand and prohibit action at the same time. The risk of a policy resulting in catastrophic harm is always possible. For example: prohibiting genetically modified crops risks significantly reduced food production; placing a moratorium on nuclear power risks an over-reliance on coal that could lead to more air pollution; implementing extreme measures to slow global warming risks impoverishment and bad health outcomes for some people. The strong version of the precautionary principle, in that "[i]t bans the very steps that it requires", thus fails to be coherent. As Sunstein states, it is not protective, it is "paralyzing".

See also

Argument from ignorance
Benefit of the doubt (similar concept)
Best available technology
Biosecurity
Centre for the Study of Existential Risk
Chesterton's fence
Complex systems
Diffusion of innovations
Ecologically sustainable development
Environmental law
Environmental Principles and Policies
Health impact assessment
Maximin principle
Micromort
Possible carcinogen
Postcautionary principle
Prevention of disasters principle
Proactionary principle
Risk aversion
Safe trade
Substitution principle (sustainability)
Superconducting Super Collider
Sustainability
Tombstone mentality
Vaccine controversies

References

Further reading
 Kai Purnhagen, "The Behavioural Law and Economics of the Precautionary Principle in the EU and its Impact on Internal Market Regulation", Wageningen Working Papers in Law and Governance 2013–04, 
 
 
 Communication from the European Commission on the precautionary principle Brusells (2000)
 European Union (2002), European Union consolidated versions of the treaty on European Union and of the treaty establishing the European community, Official Journal of the European Union, C325, 24 December 2002, Title XIX, article 174, paragraph 2 and 3.
 Greenpeace, "Safe trade in the 21st Century, Greenpeace comprehensive proposals and recommendations for the 4th Ministerial Conference of the World Trade Organisation" pp. 8–9 

 O'Riordan, T. and Cameron, J. (1995), Interpreting the Precautionary Principle, London: Earthscan Publications
 Raffensperger, C., and Tickner, J. (eds.) (1999) Protecting Public Health and the Environment: Implementing the Precautionary Principle. Island Press, Washington, DC.
 Rees, Martin. Our Final Hour (2003).
 Recuerda Girela, M.A., (2006), Seguridad Alimentaria y Nuevos Alimentos, Régimen jurídico-administrativo. Thomson-Aranzadi, Cizur Menor.
 Recuerda Girela, M.A., (2006), "Risk and Reason in the European Union Law", European Food and Feed Law Review, 5.

 Sandin, P. "Better Safe than Sorry: Applying Philosophical Methods to the Debate on Risk and the Precautionary Principle," (2004).
 Stewart, R.B. "Environmental Regulatory Decision making under Uncertainty". In An Introduction to the Law and Economics of Environmental Policy: Issues in Institutional Design, Volume 20: 71–126 (2002).
 Sunstein, Cass R. (2005), Laws of Fear: Beyond the Precautionary Principle. New York: Cambridge University Press

External links
 
 Report by the UK Interdepartmental Liaison Group on Risk Assessment, 2002. "The Precautionary Principle: Policy and Application" 
David Appell, Scientific American, January 2001: "The New Uncertainty Principle"  
 The Times, 27 July 2007, Only a reckless mind could believe in safety first
 Bill Durodié, Spiked, 16 March 2004: The precautionary principle assumes that prevention is better than cure
 European Environment Agency (2001), Late lessons from early warnings: the precautionary principle 1896–2000
 Applying the Precautionary Principle to Nanotechnology, Center for Responsible Nanotechnology 2004
 1998 Wingspread Statement on the Precautionary Principle 
 Science and Environmental Health Network,  The Precautionary Principle in Action – a Handbook]
 Gary E. Marchant, Kenneth L. Mossman: Arbitrary and Capricious: The Precautionary Principle in the European Union Courts. American Enterprise Institute Press 2004, ; free online PDF
 Umberto Izzo, La precauzione nella responsabilità civile. Analisi di un concetto sul tema del danno da contagio per via trasfusionale (e-book reprint) [The Idea of Precaution in Tort Law. Analysis of a Concept against the Backdrop of the Tainted- Blood Litigation], UNITN e-prints, 2007, first edition Padua, Cedam 2004.free online PDF
 Better Safe than Sorry: Applying Philosophical Methods to the Debate on Risk and the Precautionary Principle
 Communication from the European Commission on the precautionary principle
 UK Interdepartmental Liaison Group on Risk Assessment (ILGRA): The Precautionary Principle: Policy and Application 
 Report of UNESCO's group of experts on the Precautionary Principle (2005) 
 Max More (2010), The Perils Of Precaution 

Doubt
European Union law
Legal doctrines and principles
Public health
Risk management
Safety
Environmental policy
United Nations Framework Convention on Climate Change